Capulin is a census-designated place and unincorporated community in Union County, New Mexico, United States. Its population was 66 as of the 2010 census. Capulin had a post office until August 13, 2011; it still has its own ZIP code, 88414. U.S. routes 64 and 87 pass through the community. The town was named after the volcano by Hispanic settlers after the Civil War. It was known as Dedman from 1909 to 1922, after railroad superintendent E.J. Dedman.

Geography

Climate

Demographics

References

Census-designated places in New Mexico
Unincorporated communities in Union County, New Mexico
Census-designated places in Union County, New Mexico
Unincorporated communities in New Mexico